Jeffery Avery Fuller (born August 8, 1962) is a former professional American football safety who played in the National Football League (NFL) for the San Francisco 49ers from 1984 to 1989. He played in two Super Bowls as a member of the 49ers.

Fuller suffered a career-ending spinal injury in October 1989 against the New England Patriots at Stanford Stadium. The game was played at Stanford University due to the Loma Prieta earthquake that damaged Candlestick Park. All-Pro safety Ronnie Lott stated that Jeff Fuller was one of the hardest hitting safeties in the NFL. While he is able to walk, he is no longer able to use one of his arms.

Fuller's son, Jeffrey Fuller, Played for the Canadian Football League.

References
 

1962 births
Living people
American football safeties
San Francisco 49ers players
Texas A&M Aggies football players
Players of American football from Dallas
Franklin D. Roosevelt High School (Dallas) alumni
National Football League replacement players